Last Epoch is an early access hack and slash action role-playing game developed by Eleventh Hour Games.

In April 2018, a free playable demo was released as part of Last Epoch'''s Kickstarter drive.

In April 2019, the game's beta was made available via Steam Early Access.

In December 2019, the title's full release, originally planned for April 2020, was rescheduled to the fourth quarter of 2020.

In October 2020, the developers announced the cancellation of the Mac client for the game. In their announcement, they cited anticipated difficulties arising from Apple's transition to computers powered by ARM-based processors.

In December 2020, EHG announced that Last Epochs release was delayed until 2021. Last Epoch has since been further delayed, with no official release date as of March 2023.

 Setting 
The game is set in the world of Eterra across several timelines.

 Reception Last Epochs 2018 Kickstarter campaign managed to successfully reach its goal, ultimately raising over $250,000.

 See also DiabloPath of ExileGrim Dawn''

References

External links 

Upcoming video games scheduled for 2023
Action role-playing video games
Early access video games
Hack and slash role-playing games
Kickstarter-funded video games
Linux games
Video games developed in the United States
Windows games